Run for Your Wife may refer to:

 Run for Your Wife (play), a 1983 play by Ray Cooney
 Run for Your Wife (Modern Family), a 2009 episode of the TV series Modern Family
 Run for Your Wife (1965 film), a 1965 Italian comedy
 Run for Your Wife (2012 film), a UK-made 2012 film, based on the theatre farce Run For Your Wife

See also 
 Run for Your Life (disambiguation)